Gianmarco Tognazzi (born 11 October 1967) is an Italian actor.

Life and career 
Born on 11 October 1967 in Rome, the son of actors Ugo Tognazzi and Franca Bettoia, from his youth Tognazzi attended the film sets alongside his father, debuting in a small role in Marco Ferreri's Don't Touch the White Woman! (1974). After some experiences as an assistant director, he graduated at the Institute of State for cinematography and television "Roberto Rossellini" in Rome. In 1991 he won a Grolla d'oro for his performance in Emidio Greco's Una storia semplice. He was also nominated to Nastro d'Argento twice, in 2000 as best actor for First Light of Dawn and in 2006 in the supporting actor category for Romanzo Criminale.

In the second half of 1980s Tognazzi had also some experiences as a television presenter, including the hosting of the 1989 edition of the Sanremo Music Festival.

Selected filmography

References

External links 

1967 births
Male actors from Rome
Italian male stage actors
Italian male film actors
Italian male television actors
Living people